is a three-episode Japanese original video animation series, based on a 1996 radio drama series of the same name created by Aoi Takeuchi. Character designs in the animation were redone by Masami Oobari, based on the original designs created by Shin'ichi Miyamae for the radio series and its CD releases.

A hundred years after the Earth's surface is invaded by aliens (Space Emigrants, or SE) and humans have been forced to live in underwater cities, the last hope of saving the Earth lies in the hands of five cybernetically enhanced women. These women are trained to carry out attacks against the SE in hopes of reclaiming Earth for mankind.

An OVA directed by Hayato Date titled 電脳戦隊ヴギィ’ズ・エンジェル外伝 進め! スーパー・エンジェルス (Dennou Sentai Voogie's Angel Gaiden: Susume! Super Angels!) was released on August 21, 1998. Another OVA, a compilation titled 電脳戦隊ヴギィ’ズ・エンジェル -Forever and ever- (Dennou Sentai Voogie's Angel: Forever and Ever), was released on January 25, 1999.

Dennou Sentai Last Angels, a reboot of Voogie's Angel, had its first CD release on March 24, 2021.

Cast

References

External links 
 

1997 anime OVAs
J.C.Staff